Marcin Donesz (born December 19, 1982), better known by his stage name Onar, is a Polish rapper. He began rapping and producing in his teen years with the underground group TJK which culminated in opening for Run–D.M.C. during the Rap Day '97 concert in Warsaw. TJK fell apart shortly after, and Onar proceeded to form Płomień 81 with Pezet. As of then, Onar has recorded several solo albums.

Discography

Studio albums

Collaborative albums

References 

1982 births
Living people
Rappers from Warsaw